Prairie Schooner is a literary magazine published quarterly at the University of Nebraska–Lincoln with the cooperation of UNL's English Department and the University of Nebraska Press. It is based in Lincoln, Nebraska and was first published in 1926. Founded by Lowry Wimberly and a small group of his students, who together formed the Wordsmith Chapter of Sigma Upsilon (a national honorary literary society).

Although many assume it is a regional magazine, it is nationally and internationally distributed and publishes writers from all over the United States and the world.

Prairie Schooner has garnered reprints, and honorable mentions in the Pushcart Prize anthologies and various of the Best American series, including Best American Short Stories, Best American Essays, Best American Mystery Stories, and Best American Nonrequired Reading.

Editors and notable contributors 

Prairie Schooners current editor (2011 – present) is Jamaican/Ghanaian poet and author Kwame Dawes. From 1963-1980 Bernice Slote served as the editor.

Notable contributors

 Prairie Schooner Book Prize
Prairie Schooner Book Prize is an American literary award presented yearly since 2003, one award for poetry and one award for fiction. It is run by the literary magazine Prairie Schooner and University of Nebraska Press. Winners receive $3,000 and publication through the University of Nebraska Press.Robert Lee Brewer (2011). 2012 Writer's Market Deluxe Edition, Writer's Digest Books, September 2, 2011. Pg.984. Manuscripts are accepted from all living writers, including non-US citizens, writing in English.

Winners
Source:2003Fiction: K. L. Cook, Last Call
Poetry: Cortney Davis, Leopold's Maneuvers2004Fiction: Brock Clarke, Carrying the Torch
Poetry: Rynn Williams, Adonis Garage2005Fiction: John Keeble, Nocturnal America
Poetry: Kathleen Flenniken, Famous2006Fiction: Jesse Lee Kercheval, The Alice Stories
Poetry: Paul Guest, Notes for My Body Double2007Fiction: Katherine Vaz, Our Lady of the Artichokes and Other Portuguese-American Stories
Poetry: Mari L'Esperance, The Darkened Temple2008Fiction: Anne Finger, Call Me Ahab
Poetry: Kara Candito, Taste of Cherry2009Fiction: Ted Gilley, Bliss, And Other Short Stories
Poetry: Shane Book, Ceiling of Sticks2010Fiction: Greg Hrbek, Destroy All Monsters
Poetry: James Crews, The Book of What Stays2011Fiction: Karen Brown, Leaf House
Poetry: Susan Blackwell Ramsey, A Mind Like This2012Fiction: Xhenet Aliu, Domesticated Wild Things
Poetry: Orlando Ricardo Menes, Fetish2013Fiction: Amina Gautier, Now We Will Be Happy
Poetry: R. A. Villanueva, Reliquaria2014Fiction: Bryn Chancellor, When Are You Coming Home?
Poetry: Jennifer Perrine, No Confession, No Mass2015Fiction: Dustin M. Hoffman, One-Hundred Knuckled Fist
Poetry: Safiya Sinclair, Cannibal2016Fiction: Venita Blackburn, Black Jesus and Other Superheroes
Poetry: Susan Gubernat, The Zoo at Night2017Fiction: Sara Batkie, Better Times
Poetry: Luisa Muradyan, American Radiance2018'''
Fiction: Liz Breazeale, Extinction Events: StoriesPoetry: Aria Aber, Hard DamageReferences

 Stewart, Paul R., The Prairie Schooner Story: A Little Magazine's First 25 Years'' (Lincoln: University of Nebraska Press, 1955)

External links
The Prairie Schooner
Prairie Schooner Book Prize, official website.

Poetry magazines published in the United States
Quarterly magazines published in the United States
Magazines established in 1926
University of Nebraska–Lincoln
Magazines published in Nebraska
Mass media in Lincoln, Nebraska